The  Accademia Musicale Mediterranea  (English: Mediterranean Musical Academy) is a music institute in Rome, Taranto, Martina Franca, Leporano and Fardella, Italy.  It was founded by Cosimo Damiano Lanza in 1996 as a national centre for advanced musical studies. It is located in the Palazzo Lanza in Leporano near Taranto.  Every year, the Academy organises Piano Master Classes. During the summer months a series of concerts are held un dee the title of Emozioni Concertistiche – Young Pianists Festival. Annually it hosts students from all over Europe and the Orient. Since 2004 it has synergistic collaborations with universities, conservatories and schools:  Brigham Young University, USA ; Münchener Musikseminar in Munich, Germany; Conservatory of Gap; France, Conservatorios of S. Javier; Spain, Bocconi University, Milan; the Conservatory " Pedrollo " Vicenza; Conservatory "N. Piccinni ", Bari; International Academy of Arts in Rome, Italy. 
The director is prof. Cosimo Damiano Lanza and the president is prof. Valter Monteleone .

Professors
 Piano (Professors: Bruno Canino, Piero Rattalino, Roberto Cappello, Cosimo Damiano Lanza, Aquiles Delle Vigne, Giovanni Umberto Battel, Gianmaria Bonino, Francesca Mammana, Daniele Puglielli, Silvana Libardo, Gaetano Frascella, Agnese Urso, Pierpaolo Morbidelli, Fabio Guarino, Valfrido Ferrari, Alessandro Pisconti, Eduardo Franco Rondina, Antonio D'Abramo, Ilenia Maria Colucci, Vincenzo De Filpo, Pierluigi Camicia)
 Violin (Professors: Cybèle Stevenson, Pasquale Melucci)
 Cello (Professors: Marcello Forte, Umberto Clerici)
 Flute (Professor: Salvatore Stefanelli)
 Guitar (Professor: Pino Forrésu)
 Singing (Professor: Elvira Zamanova, Filomena Galeandro)
 Clarinet (Professors: Maria Teresa Strappati, Angelo Magnaterra)
 Trumpet (Professor: Rinaldo Strappati)
 Harpsichord (Professor: Cosimo Damiano Lanza)
 Organ (Professor: Francesco Buccolieri)
 Composition (Professors: Francesco Rolle, Vito Buccolieri, Francesco Buccolieri)

Events Piano 
1982 "Emozioni Concertistiche" Festival of Young Pianists
2010  "Premio Italia Olimpo Pianistico" (Piano Competition)

Labels recordings  
H- Demia Classic Recording :
2007 Da Brahms alle scuole Nazionali – piano: Agnese Urso and Pierpaolo Morbidelli
2007 Il Romanticismo di Schumann – piano: Alessandro Fichera and Marco Ragno
2011 Il pianismo di Gaetano Frascella
2012 Hillpark – Valter Monteleone
2014 Live – pianist Cosimo Damiano Lanza

References
 Academy
 

Music schools in Italy